In computing, a pizza box is a style of case design for desktop computers or network switches. Pizza box cases tend to be wide and flat, normally  in height, resembling pizza delivery boxes and thus the name. This is in contrast to a tower system, whose case height is much greater than the width and has an "upright" appearance.

The common setup of a pizza box system is to have the display monitor placed directly on top of the case, which serves as a podium to elevate the monitor more towards the user's eye level, and to have other peripherals placed in front and alongside the case. Occasionally, the pizza box may be laid on its sides in a tower-like orientation.

Data General's Aviion Unix server was the first to coin the expression when it advertised in 1991 with the tagline "Who just fit mainframe power in a pizza box?", but most computers generally referred to as pizza box systems were high-end desktop systems such as Sun Microsystems workstations sold in the 1990s, most notably the SPARCstation 1 and SPARCstation 5. Other notable examples have been among the highest-performing desktop computers of their generations, including the SGI Indy, the NeXTstation, and the Amiga 1000, but the form factor was also seen in budget and lower-end lines such as the Macintosh LC family. 

The original SPARCstation 1 design included an expansion bus technology, SBus, expressly designed for the form factor; expansion cards were small, especially in comparison to other expansion cards in use at the time such as VMEbus, and were mounted horizontally instead of vertically. PC-compatible computers in this type of case typically use the PCI expansion bus and are usually either a) limited to one or two horizontally placed expansion cards or b) require special low-profile expansion cards, shorter than the PCI cards regular PCs use.

The density of computing power and stackability of pizza box systems also made them attractive for use in data centers. Systems originally designed for desktop use were placed on shelves inside of 19-inch racks, sometimes requiring that part of their cases be cut off in order for them to fit. Since the late 1990s, pizza boxes have been a common form factor in office cubicles, data centers or industrial applications, where desktop space, rack room and density are critical. Servers in this form factor, as well as higher-end Ethernet switches, are now designed for rack mounting. Rack mount 1U computers come in all types of configurations and depths.

The pizza box form factor for smaller personal systems and thin clients remains in use well into the 21st century, though it is increasingly being superseded by laptops, nettops or All-in-One PC designs that embed the already size-reduced computer onto the keyboard or display monitor.

References

External links
 Pizza box in the Jargon File

Computer enclosure